One of the first railways using  gauge track was the Little Eaton Gangway in England, constructed as a horse-drawn wagonway in 1795. Other  gauge wagonways in England and Wales were also built in the early 19th century.  Also during this time, numerous tram networks were built in  gauge (see table below).

Railways

See also

References 

British narrow gauge railways
Heritage railway
2 ft and 600 mm gauge railways in the United Kingdom
2 ft 6 in gauge railways in the United Kingdom
3 ft gauge railways in the United Kingdom
Three foot six inch gauge railways in the United States